A daughter is a female offspring.

Daughter may also refer to:

Arts, entertainment, and media

Films
Daughter (2014 film), a South Korean film
Daughter (2016 film)
Daughter (2019 film), aka Dcera, a 2019 Czech animated short film
Daughter 2, a 1996 Thai film
Daughters (film), aka Our Mother's Murder, a 1997 American made-for-TV film
Dukhtar, aka Daughter, a 2014 Pakistani film
 The Daughter (2012 film), a 2012 Greek film
 The Daughter (2015 film), a 2015 Australian film
 The Daughter (2021 film), a 2021 Spanish film

Literature
The Daughter (play), an 1836 play by James Sheridan Knowles
 The Daughter (novel), a Greek novel

Music

Groups
Daughter (band), London-based band
Daughters (band), an American rock band

Albums and EPs
Daughters (album), the self-titled 2010 studio album by band Daughters
Daughters (EP), the self-titled 2002 EP by band Daughters

Songs
"Daughter" (song), from Pearl Jam's album Vs., 1993
"Daughter", by Daughters from You Won't Get What You Want, 2018
"Daughter", by Loudon Wainwright III from Strange Weirdos, 2007
"Daughter", by Sleeping at Last from Atlas: Life, 2015
"Daughter", by Status Quo from Ma Kelly's Greasy Spoon, 1970
"Daughter", by The Blenders  August 1963
"Daughters" (John Mayer song), from the album Heavier Things, 2003
"Daughters" (Nas song), from the album Life Is Good, 2012
"Daughters", by The Story So Far from Under Soil And Dirt, 2011
"The Daughters", by Little Big Town from Nightfall, 2019

Science
Daughter cell, the biological cells resulting from cell division
Daughter isotope, in physics, a nuclide formed by radioactive decay of another

Other uses
Daughter language, in linguistics, any later language derived from an earlier language, or a subordinate node in a phrase structure tree
Daughterboard, in computing, a subordinate extension of a motherboard